Terje Moland Pedersen (born 22 March 1952) is a Norwegian police officer and politician for the Labour Party.

He finished his secondary education in 1972, and graduated from police academy in 1977. From 1974 to 1995 he worked as a police officer, since 1977 in Fredrikstad. He became involved in the trade unions, and was a supervisory council member of Norsk Politiforbund from 1992 to 1996.

He was a member of Fredrikstad municipal council from 1991 to 2005. From 2005 to 2012 he was a State Secretary in the Ministry of Justice and the Police as a part of Stoltenberg's Second Cabinet.

He chaired Borg Port Authority from 1993 to 1996 and 1999 to 2003, was a board member of Viken Havneselskap from 2003 to 2005 and chaired Norwegian Ports Association from 2004 to 2005.

References

1952 births
Living people
People from Fredrikstad
Norwegian police officers
Østfold politicians
Labour Party (Norway) politicians
Norwegian state secretaries